Russell A. Livigni (born 20 July 1934) is a rubber industry scientist and executive noted for his discovery and development of high trans styrene-butadiene rubber, a crystallizing rubber that provides superior oxidation resistance relative to natural rubber.

Education

Livigni is a native of Akron, Ohio.  His aptitude for scientific work was recognized early - in high school he won the Bausch and Lomb award in science.  He graduated from Kenmore High School in 1952.  After graduation, he took a job at the Firestone Tire and Rubber Company's synthetic rubber development lab, while also working towards his undergraduate degree.  He completed his B.Sc. in chemistry in 1956, and his Ph.D. in polymer chemistry in 1960.  Both degrees were earned at the University of Akron.  During his time as an undergraduate, he worked in the university's Institute of Rubber Research.

Career

 1961 - joined GenCorp as a senior research chemist
 1962-1963 - Group leader, polymer characterization
 1963-1975 - Section Head, Materials Chemistry and Polymer Characterization
 1975-1980 - Manager, Polymer and Analytical Chemistry
 1980-1987 - Associate Director of Research
 1988-1995 - Vice President and Director, GenCorp Research
 1995 - Vice-President, Corporate Technology
 1996 - retired to consult for Omnova, a GenCorp spinoff

Livigni holds 37 patents.

Awards
 1997 - Melvin Mooney Distinguished Technology Award.
 2013 - Charles Goodyear Medal of the Rubber Division of the American Chemical Society.

References

Living people
Polymer scientists and engineers
American scientists
1934 births